Syrmatia is a South American metalmark butterfly genus in the subfamily Riodininae.
 
 
There are four species in the genus. All are Neotropical and have long tails on the hindwings.

External links
Syrmatia at EOL
TOL 
Syrmatia at Markku Savela's website on Lepidoptera

Riodinini
Riodinidae of South America
Butterfly genera
Taxa named by Jacob Hübner